German submarine U-1195 was a Type VIIC U-boat of Nazi Germany's Kriegsmarine.

Her keel was laid down 6 February 1943, by F. Schichau, of Danzig. She was commissioned 4 November 1943.

Design
German Type VIIC submarines were preceded by the shorter Type VIIB submarines. U-1195 had a displacement of  when at the surface and  while submerged. She had two shafts and two  propellers.

U-1195 was fitted with five  torpedo tubes (four fitted at the bow and one at the stern), fourteen torpedoes, one  SK C/35 naval gun, (220 rounds), one  Flak M42 and two twin  C/30 anti-aircraft guns. The boat had a complement of between forty-four and sixty.

Service history
Under the command of Ernst Cordes, she sank the Liberty Ship John R. Park.  on 21 March 1945.

U-1195 attacked Convoy VWP 16 in the English Channel, sinking the troop transport  on 6 April 1945. Fifty crew members were alive when she sank; however, only 14 survived. Kemp reports the crew had to make a risky underwater escape from the wrecked vessel.

Summary of raiding history

References

Bibliography

Paul Kemp (1997) U-Boats Destroyed. Arms and Armour

External links

German Type VIIC submarines
U-boats commissioned in 1943
U-boats sunk in 1945
World War II submarines of Germany
World War II shipwrecks in the English Channel
Wreck diving sites in the United Kingdom
Ships built in Danzig
1943 ships
U-boats sunk by British warships
U-boats sunk by depth charges
Ships built by Schichau
Maritime incidents in April 1945